Niels Jørgen Cappelørn (born 1945) is a Danish theologian, Søren Kierkegaard scholar and former director of Søren Kierkegaard Research Center at the University of Copenhagen. He has written and edited a number of books on Kierkegaard, and was editor of Index til Søren Kierkegaards Papirer, bind XIV-XVI (1975–78). He was Director of the Danish Bible Society from 1980 to 1993.

Professor Cappelørn is a member of the Danish Council of Ethics, a body which provides advice to the Danish Parliament and raises public debate about ethical problems in the field of biomedicine, and a member of the Norwegian Academy of Science and Letters. He was made a Knight of the Order of the Dannebrog in 1992. A festschrift in his honor, At Være Sig Selv Nærværende (To Be Present to Oneself) was published in 2010, on the occasion of Professor Cappelørn's 65th birthday.

References

External links
Niels Jørgen Cappelørn

1945 births
Living people
Danish Protestant theologians
Members of the Norwegian Academy of Science and Letters
Knights of the Order of the Dannebrog
20th-century Protestant theologians